Airstream may refer to:

 Airstream trailers and recreational vehicles
 Ford Airstream concept automobile (2007)
 Chrysler Airstream automobile (1935 to 1936)
 DeSoto Airstream automobile (1935-1936)

It may also relate to:
 Airstream mechanism (phonetics)

See also
 Air stream